PG 1047+003 is a post-AGB blue-white subdwarf star, located in the constellation of Sextans. The star is classed as member of the V361 Hydrae type (or also called sdBVr type) class of pulsators in the field of asteroseismology. No additional stellar companion has been detected in tight orbit or imaged around the subdwarf star.

References

B-type subdwarfs
Sextans (constellation)
Sextantis, UY
TIC objects